The Museum of Dr. Moses: Tales of Mystery and Suspense is a short story collection by Joyce Carol Oates which comprises shorter works in a darker genre. In "The Man Who Fought Roland LaStarza" a woman’s world is upended when she learns the brutal truth about a family friend’s death—and what her father is capable of. Meanwhile, a businessman desperate to find his missing two-year-old grandson in "Suicide Watch" must determine whether the horrifying tale his junkie son tells him about the boy’s whereabouts is a confession or a sick test. In "Valentine, July Heat Wave" a man prepares a gruesome surprise for the wife determined to leave him. And the children of a BTK-style serial killer struggle to decode the patterns behind their father’s seemingly random bad acts, as well as their own, in "Bad Habits."

In these and other stories, Joyce Carol Oates explores with bloodcurdling insight the ties that bind—or worse.

References

2007 short story collections
Short story collections by Joyce Carol Oates